Daddy's Groove are an Italian house band formed by Carlo Grieco and Peppe Folliero. Based in Naples, Daddy's Groove have co-produced and remixed for artists such as Axwell, Justin Bieber, Lady Gaga, Sia, Nicki Minaj, Celine Dion, Bruno Mars, Sean Paul and Usher, among others.
They have released singles alongside Bob Sinclar, Kryder and Tom Staar and scored several top 10 positions on Beatport. In 2016, Daddy's Groove entered the DJ Mag top 100.

They are signed to the independent label Spinnin Records. They have a residency at the Pacha nightclub, and have also gone on multiple world tours.

History

2006–2012: Formation and exposure 
Initially forming as "Black Raw" and "Spit" in 2008 changed their name to "Daddy's Groove" which better fit each other's influences. They first gained exposure when Swedish House Mafia's Axwell asked them to remix his track "Nothing But Love". This was followed by an offer to be Swedish House Mafia's opening act for Masquerade Motel in Ibiza. Daddy's Groove was also asked by David Guetta to provide additional production on his album "Nothing But The Beat" and remixes for some of his tracks.

2013: Surrender and Tomorrowland 
Daddy's Groove released several tracks on Spinnin' Records, including Stellar, Vertigo (featuring Cryogenix) and Walking On Air (featuring Dino), which topped various Beatport charts. They also released Hurricane and Unbelievable (featuring Rob Adans) on Doorn Records.

During 2013 Daddy's Groove toured extensively around the world; performing throughout the US, Europe, Australia, China, India and Japan. Most of their bookings were at clubs including Ministry of Sound, Marquee Las Vegas, Pacha Sydney, Story Miami, Vision Tokyo and Zouk Singapore. David Guetta booked Daddy's Groove for his Ibiza summer residency, "Fuck Me I'm Famous", three years in a row at Pacha Ibiza and Ushuaia.

Catching the attention of Black Eyed Peas' will.i.am; Daddy's Groove were asked to work on the production of Britney Spears' latest album "Britney Jean". They also did the mixing of Lady Gaga's track "Fashion!" on her "Artpop" album.

By the end of 2013, after signing to Ultra Records, they released "Surrender" together with Mindshake. Their popularity increased further when David Guetta offered them to join him, Nicky Romero and Afrojack on the mainstage of Belgium's biggest festival Tomorrowland.

2014: Collaboration with Congorock 
Daddy's Groove continued their success in 2014 with their track "Miners". This was followed by "Synthemilk", a collaborative track with Mindshake, which reached #3 on Beatport's Top 10. They performed at major festivals throughout the summer including Global Gathering and Tomorrowland Their track "Pulse", featuring vocals from Teammate, saw them return to Beatport and iTunes chart.

Daddy's Groove was also credited for Additional Production and Drums Programming on 7 tracks featured on David Guetta's album "Listen".

2015: Weekly residency and Tribe 
Daddy's Groove released for the first time on Steve Aoki's label Dim Mak with "Pros & iCons" in 2015. A follow-up to their single "Synthemilk", entitled "Black Sun", was released next. According to their social media accounts, they have been in the studio with several artists including vocalist Luciana. Daddy's Groove secured a weekly residency in the well-known Italian Riviera area and introduced their own party called "Tribe". Another one of their tracks, "Where I Belong", was premiered at ADE 2015 before hitting radio stations and charts around the world. "I Stay True", ft. Jaxx Da Fishworks & $andhiv, was their last track of the year and released through Kryder's Sosumi Records.

2016: Return to Spinnin' Records 
In 2016, ten years after their formation, Daddy's Groove returned to Spinnin' Records. Their first release of the year was "WOW!", a collaboration with Mindshake, featuring vocals from Kris Kiss, on sub-label Doorn Records. Shortly after, they revealed "Back To 94" featuring Cimo Fränkel on Spinnin' Records. A pop influenced track designed to bring back the nostalgia of the 90's; it reached over 300,000 views on Spinnin' Records' YouTube channel in just 2 days. Daddy's Groove then released two further tracks on Doorn Records. "Tribe" featuring Steve Biko was followed by a collaboration with Promise Land in the form of "Scratchin". In October, together with Bob Sinclar, Daddy's Groove released "Burning" on Spinnin' Records. Their final track of 2016, "Street Life", was created with Kryder and released on his label Cartel Recordings.

2017: Railgun with Tom Staar and DJMAG ASEAN 
Daddy's Groove has partnered with Tom Staar for their first track of 2017, Railgun, which released on 6 February on DOORN Records. Mixed David Guetta "2U" and Bruno Mars vs. Guetta "Versace on The Floor".
In July Daddy's Groove yet again produced another hit record on DOORN Records: "Basement".
in October they were chosen as official ambassadors for DJMAG ASEAN.

2018: Latido, BVULGARI and AFRICANISM 
Daddy's Groove start the 2018 with Latido on Spinnin records. His new track, in collaboration with Ferdy, is a Latino-groovy one perfect to inflame the dancefloor.
They also makes return on DJ MagPoll 2018: Daddy's Groove  With their track BVULGARI  they climb the viral rankings of spotify in  many countries around the world.
After a few years of ice, Bob Sinclar's Africanism label made its big comeback with the track of Erik Hagleton, "City of Gold" and Daddy's Groove made it a remix.

2019: Heldeep records, gold record and DJMAG TOP 100 
Daddy's Groove returns with 2 tracks  released on Oliver Heldens'label Heldeep: "Been a long time" and "Addicted to drums"  with Ferdy. They also  produce the "Pensare male" track of The Kolors and Elodie. The single has become a gold record in Italy.
They are also confirmed in the top 100 DJ MagPoll 2019: Daddy's Groove

Discography

Singles

Remixes 
2018: Erik Hagleton – "City of Gold" (Daddy's Groove Remix)
2019: Soha – "Les Enfants du Bled" (Daddy's Groove 2019 rework)
2020: Moguai – "Everybody's Got to Learn Sometime" (Daddy's Groove Remix)

References

External links 
 
 Daddy's Groove Soundcloud
 Daddy's Groove on Beatport
 Daddy's Groove on Spotify

Musical groups established in 2006
Italian musical duos
Italian house music groups
Remixers
Italian DJs
Musicians from Naples
Electronic dance music duos